Kamfiruz District is a district (bakhsh) in Marvdasht County, Fars Province, Iran. At the 2006 census, its population was 31,341, in 6,774 families.  The District has two cities: Kamfiruz & Khaniman. The District has three rural districts (dehestan): Kamfiruz-e Jonubi Rural District, Kamfiruz-e Shomali Rural District, and Khorram Makan Rural District.

References 

Marvdasht County
Districts of Fars Province